Nekrylovsky is a rural locality (a settlement) in Kolenovskoye Rural Settlement, Novokhopyorsky District, Voronezh Oblast, Russia. The population was 141 as of 2010.

Geography 
Nekrylovsky is located 49 km WSW of Novokhopyorsk (the district's administrative centre) by road. Beryozovka is the nearest rural locality.

References 

Populated places in Novokhopyorsky District